The 1998 STAR CHOICE World Junior Curling Championships were held in Thunder Bay, Ontario, Canada March 21–29.

Men's

Playoffs

Women's

Tiebreaker
 11-2

Playoffs

Sources

J
World Junior Curling Championships
Curling in Northern Ontario
1998 in Ontario
Sports competitions in Thunder Bay
International curling competitions hosted by Canada
1998 in youth sport
March 1998 sports events in Canada
Curling competitions in Ontario